Kalgo is a Local Government Area (LGA) in Kebbi State, Nigeria. It was created in 1996 out of the Bunza LGA. Its headquarters are in the town of Kalgo. Kalgo LGA shares a west border with Bunza LGA.

It has an area of 1,173 km and a population of 85,403 at the 2006 census.

The postal code of the area is 862.

References

Local Government Areas in Kebbi State